Juan Bregaliano (born November 22, 1911, date of death unknown) is an Uruguayan boxer who competed in the 1936 Summer Olympics. In 1936 he was eliminated in the second round of the middleweight class after losing his fight to the upcoming gold medalist Jean Despeaux.

External links
Juan Bregaliano's profile at Sports Reference.com

1911 births
Year of death missing
Middleweight boxers
Olympic boxers of Uruguay
Boxers at the 1936 Summer Olympics
Uruguayan people of Italian descent
Uruguayan male boxers